James Harkins (born December 29, 1953) is an American politician who served as Director of Maryland Environmental Services from 2005 until March 2016. He also is a former Harford County Executive and Delegate for District 35A. In December 2019, Maryland Governor Larry Hogan appointed Harkins to the University of Maryland Medical System board of directors.

Education
Harkins attended Bel Air High School. He received his A.A. from Harford Community College.

Career
Harkins joined the Harford County Sheriff's Office and was eventually promoted to sergeant.
He was awarded Police Officer of the Year - Harford County by the Baltimore Sun in 1981 and Deputy of the Year, Harford County Sheriff's Department, 1981.

He chaired the Republican Central Committee, Harford County, 1987–90. In 1996, he was elected as Delegate, Republican Party National Convention, 1996, 2000, 2004.

In 1998, Harkins was elected as Harford County Executive. He served in this office until June 30, 2005 when Governor Robert Ehrlich appointed him to be Director of Maryland Environmental Service.

Election results
1994 Race for Maryland House of Delegates – District 35A
Voters to choose two:
{| class="wikitable"
!Name
!Votes
!Percent
!Outcome
|-
|-
|James M. Harkins, Rep.
|18,655
|  36%
|   Won
|-
|-
|Donald C. Fry, Dem.
|14,458
|  28%
|   Won
|-
|-
|James F. Greenwell, Rep.
|10,443
|  20%
|   Lost
|-
|-
|Joseph Lutz, Dem.
|7,858
|  15%
|   Lost
|}

1990 Race for Maryland House of Delegates – District 35A
Voters to choose two:
{| class="wikitable"
!Name
!Votes
!Percent
!Outcome
|-
|-
|James M. Harkins, Rep.
|10.122
|  29%
|   Won
|-
|-
|Donald C. Fry, Dem.
|8,791
|  25%
|   Won
|-
|-
|James A. Adkins, Rep.
|8,594
|  24%
|   Lost
|-
|-
|Joseph Lutz, Dem.
|7,946
|  22%
|   Lost
|}

References and notes

External links

1953 births
Living people
Republican Party members of the Maryland House of Delegates
People from Havre de Grace, Maryland
Harford County Executives
Harford Community College alumni